Porvarinlahti (Swedish Borgarstrandsviken) is a bay in Helsinki (before 1 January 2009 in Vantaa), Finland, near the borders of Vantaa and Sipoo.

Porvarinlahti used to be the only place where Vantaa directly bordered the Baltic Sea. The bay is approximately 2 km long and 50 m wide. Immediately to the south of the bay lies Helsinki and immediately to the north lies Sipoo. On January 1, 2009, Vantaa ceded the Porvarinlahti area to Helsinki as Helsinki annexes part of Sipoo. Helsinki thus gained a third neighbour municipality and Vantaa lost its only connection to the sea.

References

Geography of Helsinki
Landforms of Uusimaa
Bays of Finland